Admiral Vinogradov is an  of the Russian Navy; it is currently active with the Russian Pacific Fleet. It is named for Admiral Nikolai Ignatevich Vinogradov.

History 

Admiral Vinogradov was laid down in the former Soviet Union in February 1986 and was launched in June 1987. The ship was commissioned and joined the Pacific Fleet on 30 December 1988. In August 1990, she was one of three Soviet warships to visit San Diego, California. After the fall of the Soviet regime in 1991 the destroyer joined the new Russian Navy.

Admiral Vinogradov was deployed to the Persian Gulf alongside UK and NATO ships to enforce United Nations (UN) resolutions on Iraq in September 1992 along with the Russian tanker .

On 17 November 2010, the ship left Vladivostok to Gulf of Aden to participate in the UN anti-piracy mission of the Horn of Africa. The ship was seen shadowing several US naval vessels during the RIMPAC 2016 naval exercise near Hawaii. In September 2016 the destroyer participated in the joint Russian-Chinese exercise in the South China Sea.

Each side blamed the other for the near collision. Russian sources stated that the incident occurred in the southeast of the East China Sea while US sources named the location as in the Philippine Sea. The Russian Navy claimed that the US ship made an unsafe maneuver, with Admiral Vinogradov forced to change course in order to avoid a collision. The Russian military also claimed to have sent a protest to the US Navy. However, according to retired US Navy captain Carl Schuster, the Russian ship's wake shows that it "didn't adhere to either the rules of the road or the incidents at sea agreement." United States Seventh Fleet spokesman Commander Clayton Doss said the Russian destroyer came within  of USS Chancellorsville, "putting the safety of her crew and ship at risk." As of 2020, Admiral Vinogradov entered refit to upgrade to the standard of her sister ship, . She is expected to return to service in 2024–2025.

Gallery

References

External links
 

1987 ships
Destroyers of the Russian Navy
Cold War destroyers of the Soviet Union
Ships built at Yantar Shipyard
Udaloy-class destroyers